Mr. Money with the Vibe is the debut studio album by Nigerian singer Asake, following his signing with YBNL Nation in February 2022. It was released on 7 September 2022 through Empire Distribution. The album comprises 12 tracks, which were all produced by Magicsticks. The album features two guest appearances from Russ and Burna Boy. Two other tracks which have been previously released as singles from the album are "Peace Be Unto You (PBUY)" and "Terminator" which were released in June 2022 and August 2022 respectively. This album release is a follow up to his extended play Ololade Asake which was released in February 2022 immediately after being signed by Olamide to YBNL. Following the album's release, it peaked at number 66 on the Bilboard 200 chart in September 2022.

Background
Prior to the release of this studio album, Asake had been quite active in the Nigerian music industry for sometime, having released singles like "Body", "Yan Yan", "Don't Hype Me", "My Lady", and "Mr Money" among other singles. But he broke into prominence when Olamide, who he credits as having a pivotal role in his success and also the owner of YBNL Nation, got exposed to the artiste and recorded a verse on Asake's "Omo Ope" which was an unreleased track as at the time. Not long after, Asake got signed under YBNL which comes with a distribution partnership with Empire and the song was released to the public 19 January 2022. As a follow up to the released single, he consequently released an Extended Play titled "Ololade Asake" on 17 February 2022 with four tracks; "Baba God", "Trabaye", "Sungba" and the already released "Omo Ope". The songwriter has been on an unprecedented run in 2022. Aside from the previously mentioned tracks, Asake also released another track titled "Palazzo" with DJ Spinall, which had listeners from all around the world as well as featuring on the track "Bandana" from his label mate Fireboy's album Playboy.

Reception and performance

The album which has been in high anticipation amongst fans, considering his impressive run since he got signed officially into the music industry has fueled the project to achieve some feats and records within and outside Nigeria. 'Mr. Money With The Vibe' set a new record on Apple Music after becoming the African album with the most first day streams as well as the most opening three-day streams.
This debut album also became the first African album to have all its tracks occupy the top 10 spots on Apple Music Nigeria Top 100 since the project release 8 September up until 15 September 2022 when Wizkid's "Bad to Me" dropped and claimed the number one spot. In less than 48 hours, "Organise", a track from the album reclaimed the number one spot and continued the run with eight other tracks in the top 10 chart. It also recorded the biggest debut week for any album on Audiomack since TurnTable Charts began tracking in July 2020.

Upon the album release, it has reached Number One on the Top Albums Chart in 31 countries worldwide, including Nigeria, the UK and Ireland. Songs from Mr. Money with the Vibe album reached the Daily Top 100 in 60 countries worldwide, including 26 where they reached the top 10. Songs off the album also reached Number One in 14 countries worldwide.

Mr. Money with the Vibe scored a debut on the UK Albums Chart entering at number 22. This followed its impressive first week in the United Kingdom which makes it the first Nigerian album to debut on the chart. This project also peaked at number one in 26 countries on Apple Music Album Chart including 6 European countries.

Track listing

Charts

References

2022 debut albums
Yoruba-language albums
Empire Distribution albums
YBNL Nation albums